Yahud may refer to:
  or Yahudy, the Arabic word for Jews
 Yehud, a city in Israel located near the Ben Gurion Airport

See also
 Yehudi (disambiguation)